Frédéric François (born Francesco Barracato; 3 June 1950 in Lercara Friddi, Sicily, Italy), is a French-speaking singer-composer living in Belgium.

Biography

Origins and childhood

Born on 3 June 1950 in Lercara Friddi in Sicily, in a very modest Italian family, he is the second child of Antonina (Nina) Salemi and Giuseppe (Peppino) Barracato.  His mother was a seamstress in Lercara and his father was initially a miner in a sulphur mine in Lercara. He emigrated to Belgium in the coal basin of Liège, where he signed a three-year contract as a miner.
In 1951, Nina and her two sons joined Giuseppe in Tilleur in a Red Cross Convoy. Francesco Barracato grew up in a family of eight children. Peppino used to sing Neapolitan songs and opera arias for pleasure and accompanied himself on the guitar. Young Francesco was only 10 when he sang O Sole Mio for the first time in public in a café frequented mostly by Sicilians in Tilleur, "Le Passage à Niveau" [The Level Crossing].

Early days

In 1963, he turned semi-professional as a singer-guitarist in a group called "Les Eperviers" [The Sparrow hawks]. He left the technical college in 1965 for the Liège conservatoire to study violin, where he took courses particularly in diction, declamation and voice.

In 1966, he joined a new group called "Les Tigres Sauvages" [Wild Tigers] and won the  "Microsillon d'Argent" [Silver Microgroove Record] at the Festival of Châtelet in Belgium – a prize that included the recording of a single. He recorded two titles:  “Petite fille” [Little Girl] and "”Ne pleure pas" [Don't cry], under the pseudonym of François Bara. His father bought the 500 records that were pressed and managed to sell them for jukeboxes. The winner also got to perform as a warm-up act for three confirmed artists: Johnny Hallyday, Pascal Danel and Michel Polnareff, his idol.

In 1969, his meeting with the Belgian producer Constant Defourny led to his first contract with a record company: Barclay-Belgique. He recorded “Sylvie” in July 1969, and released his first single under the name of Frédéric François, in homage to the composer Chopin, whose real first name was Frédéric-François. He gave his first performances as a solo artist in venues in the Liège region during the tour of The Best Group orchestra: he performed five of his own compositions, including Sylvie, of course.  He released a new single, “Les Orgues de Saint Michel” [The Organ of Saint Michael], which was not at all successful, then another one, "Marian," accompanied by a second title "Comme tous les amoureux," [Like all people in love], which was written especially to represent Belgium at the Eurovision contest in 1970, but was not selected.

1970s

In 1970, Frédéric François recorded a new title "Jean", an adaptation of the song in the British film The Prime of Miss Jean Brodie by Ronald Neame (1969). Distributed on the AZ label, this song crossed the Franco-Belgian border, thanks to Lucien Morisse, the programming director of Europe 1, who played it on his channel and enabled the young singer to have a number one single on the hit parade for the first time, though it was not enough to make him famous.  He subsequently released two singles "Le pays d'où tu viens" [The Country you come from] and "Shabala": the first was broadcast on the Formule J programme of the Belgian radio corporation, the RTB.  The fan base begins to grow.

In 1970, he married Monique Vercauteren, a miner's daughter, whom he had met a year earlier. He recorded a new song, this time spoken and not sung, "I love you je t'aime" as a duet with Monique. Their first child, Gloria, was born on 13 February 1971.  "I love you, je t'aime" was played over and over on the Dutch pirate station Veronica, which broadcast from a boat anchored outside territorial waters. The 30,000 sold copies of this record are to be considered as the first real recognition on the part of the public. But Monique continued to work at the factory; Frédéric was not earning much from his music and experienced a certain discouragement when he composed "Comme on jette une bouteille à la mer" [Like a bottle thrown in the sea] and "Je n'ai jamais aimé comme je t'aime" [I have never loved the way I love you], with lyrics by Marino Atria.

Having stayed at the no. 1 spot of the Formule J hit parade for thirteen weeks, Frédéric François emerged from anonymity, which made his new label, Vogue-Belgique, decide to distribute "Je n'ai jamais aimé comme je t'aime," prudently only in French record shops in Pas-de-Calais, a region next to Belgium: 250,000 copies were sold. He considers this sixth single, recorded under the name of Frédéric François, as his first real hit.

His second child, Vincent, was born a few months later, on 15 May 1972. The real hit was to come in the summer of that year: “Je voudrais dormir près de toi” [I would like to sleep near you], which sold 500,000 copies and went to number one in several countries.

As hit followed hit, ("Laisse-moi vivre ma vie" [Let me live my life] (end of 1972– one million records sold), "Viens te perdre dans mes bras" [Come and lose yourself in my arms] (1973), "Chicago" (1975), tour would follow tour. That is when his second son and third child, Anthony, was born, on 8 January 1976. Frédéric François is classified among the "romantic crooners for young girls", (like Patrick Juvet, Christian Delagrange, Dave, Mike Brant).  He could capitalise on his success until 1979, when the arrival of disco would dislodge him from the top of the pops.

1980s

The crossing of the wilderness would last three years, until 1982. This low ebb took its toll with psychosomatic effects: he suffered serious attacks of spasmophilia which would become less frequent only when he started having hits again, thanks to free radios, which had just made their appearance, and played the title “Adios Amor” [Goodbye love] at every turn – an adaptation by the lyricist Michel Jourdan of a Germany song by Andy Borg. 500,000 copies the single sold in a few weeks, followed by "Aimer" [Love] (adaptation M.Jourdan/Andy Borg) in 1983. This return to grace enabled him to go on tour again, which would take him to Haiti where he sang for the first time in that country.

In 1984, he signed with Trema, the record company of Michel Sardou and Enrico Macias.  Up until then, Frédéric François had sold mainly singles, in spite of thirteen LPs at Vogue.  He released a new album "Mon cœur te dit je t'aime" [My heart tells you that I love you], which went three times gold.

The creation of the Top 50 that same year would prove a decisive turning point in his career, since for the first time in recording history, singers were ranked according to their actual sales and not on subjective criteria. And yet, showbiz circles in Paris were still reticent. He was 34 years old when he performed at the Olympia for the first time, thanks to his impresario, Moïse Benitah, who managed to convince Jean-Michel Boris and Paulette Coquatrix.  The show was sold out. And the craze for his new song "Je t'aime à l'italienne" [I love you, Italian style] was such that his name would be in lights once again the following year (1985) on the great music hall on the right bank, while his first book Les yeux charbon [Coal Eyes] (Carrère-Lafon) was a homage to his family and his public.

On 14 April 1987, his father Peppino Barracato died. The success of his new album "Une nuit ne suffit pas" [One night is not enough] (first joint effort with a female lyricist, Michaele) and the preparation of his third Olympia show in 1988, helped him to overcome this shock.

In 1989, he sang in twenty-five cities in Canada, as well as in the United States (April 1989) in Miami and in New York, where he gave five performances in three different venues: Brooklyn College and Queen's College at the CUNY, and the Town Hall Foundation.

1990s

For three weeks, from 1 to 18 March 1990, Frédéric François performed at the Olympia. The first evening, as he went off stage, he was told that his fourth child, Victoria, had been born while he was performing the last song of his show, "Je t'aime à l'italienne."  Two years later, he would perform on that fabled stage for an entire month – the longest run in his career.

In 1993, he left Trema to create his own production company, MBM, in order to gain complete creative freedom, and signed a contract with BMG for the distribution. He released the last vinyl single of his career, "L'amour c'est la musique" [Life is music]. Then came his first CD entitled "Tzigane" [Gypsy] (as well as a first excerpt from the same single title in Belgium).

On 20 December 1996, he was received in a private audience by Pope John Paul II in Rome, with other distinguished guests. Note 8. On that occasion, he sang for the first time in his life before the Pope, accompanied by 70 musicians and the choruses of the Rome opera.

His mother, whom he always admired, died on 17 August 1997. Frédéric François dedicated to her his eighth appearance at the Olympia in March 1998, followed by a tour that attracted more than 300,000 spectators.  He knew that he was going to sing for the first time in his life in his native village of Lercara Friddi in Sicily on 30 May 1999.  A few months before that event, he recorded an album with Italian classics ("Volare", "Come Prima", "Ciao Ciao Bambina") entitled "Les plus grandes mélodies italiennes" [The Greatest Italian Melodies].  He also introduced a family song known to many Sicilians "La porta abanidduzza" [The door ajar], and for the first time in his career, he sang in the Sicilian language. He considered it as a return to his roots and a way to celebrate thirty years of success.

In 1999, the Editions LCJ Productions released a VHS of the film "Les dédales d'Icare" [The maze of Icarus] Armand Rocour (1981 Belgium); the song of the film Je voyage [I am travelling], was performed by Frédéric François who was playing his first role in a film.

2000s

Frédéric François entered the 21st century by publishing his second book, Ma vie [My life] (Editions Hors Collection) with the journalist Serge Igor, where he talks about his life as never before, and opens his personal photo archives for the first time.

His tour in 2002–2003 featured more than 100 consecutive performances in France, Belgium and Switzerland.  He decided to pay homage to Tino Rossi by covering his biggest hits in 2003: Méditerranée, Marinella, Ave Maria, Petit Papa Noël.

In 2004, during his eleventh appearance at the Olympia, he sang in English for the first time in his career, Elvis Presley's song, "Love Me Tender", to a standing ovation. In 2005, after three years without any recordings, he released a CD with 15 songs, including "Et si on parlait d'amour" [And if we spoke of love]. It sold 200,000 copies in a few weeks.

In October 2005, he published his third book, "Autobiographie d'un Sicilien" [Autobiography of a Sicilian] (Editions Ramsay), where he presents his values and ideals. That year, some of his lady admirers would give him another nickname than the famous "Frédo," by calling him "La voix de l'amour" [The voice of love].

Frédéric François likes to share snippets of his private life. That is why the album released on 14 June 2006, entitled "Mes Préférences" is emblematic, because it marks out the highlights of his career and family life: a song sung for the first time in public at the age of ten (“O Sole Mio”); his first recording (Petite fille); his first big hit (“Laisse-moi vivre ma vie”); the song written in honour of his mother  while she was alive “Mamina” (“My little mamma” in Sicilian); the tender declaration for his latest little child, Victoria "Fou d'elle"  [Mad about her]; the title which he composed for the sixth anniversary of his father's death, "Le Strapontin de papa"  [Dad's folding chair].

Frédéric François said "Merci la vie!" [Thank you life] twice in a year's time: The first time on 22 October 2007, with his CD entitled, literally, “Merci la vie!” [Thank you life], and the second time on 22 October 2008 with the publication of the book with photos devoted to him, with more than 300 shots by Patrick Carpentier, "Merci la vie !" (Editions Du Rocher).  Nevertheless, he fell ill on 26 October 2008 a little before his concert at the Forum of Liège, overcome by an excessive dose of cortisone. He was hospitalised twice at the Liège Academic Medical Center. He stayed there for nearly a month the first time, from 28 November to 22 December 2008, and fifteen days the second time in February 2009. Whilst on his hospital bed, the live album then the DVD version of the Frédéric François tour from the Olympia to Forest National were released, which mixed recordings of his performances on stage in Paris and in Brussels.

The doctors recommended complete rest. He put his career on hold for a year. He would sing again in public, exceptionally, during the Télévie programme on the Belgian RTL-TVI channel for cancer research. He is seen performing Frank Sinatra's Something' Stupid with his daughter Victoria, a duet created together in March 2008 on the Olympia stage on his daughter's eighteenth birthday.  He resumed his activities on 31 October 2009 by resuming his tour where he had left of: on the stage of the Forum in Liège.

2010s

In 2010, he released a new album, “Chanteur d’amour” [Singer of love], followed by an object book "Une vie d'amour" [A life of love], and appeared at the Olympia from 11 to 20 February 2011, then at Forest National on 5 March 2011 [reference necessary]. He released a CD entitled "40 Succès en or" [40 golden hits] included in a DVD.

After a year on tour, on 3 and 4 March 2012, he returned to the Olympia, with his friends Liane Foly and Roberto Alagna as guests.

He also appeared in the "Vivement Dimanche" programme on France 2 on 20 October 2013, to promote his new album "Amor Latino" [Latin Love] (which was released on 21 October 2013), and he sang "Qu'as-tu fait da moi" [What have you done to me] and "Amor Latino", on that programme.

After that show, Michel Drucker said that he had attracted the season's biggest audience thanks to Frédéric François. The "Amor Latino" album was a new development in the "Frédéric François" style:  a real “musical blend” came into being, with the creation of new musical styles:  classic-pop, rock-tango, r&b – tango, electro-swing, etc.

He celebrated his 14th run at the Olympia from 28 February to 9 March 2014, then went on tour until 2015. On 18 August 2014, he released a “Best of” collection of 3 CDs and on 20 October, the CD “30 ans d’Olympia- Live 2014” [Thirty years of Olympia – Live 2014] was released.

In December 2014, his daughter, Victoria Barracato, produced his new clip: Fidèle. For the end-of-year holidays, Frédéric François released an album “Magie de Noël” [Magic of Christmas], which included the standard Christmas songs, several universal songs and one original work: “Avant Noël” [Before Christmas].

Career

Whilst he's just celebrated 40 years in show business, Frédéric François is giving sold out concerts, his record sales have exceeded 35 million copies, ranking him number three in number of records sold among singers with Belgian nationality, behind Salvatore Adamo and Jacques Brel.  He has had 85 gold records, singles and albums together, 15 gold awards for his sales of videos and DVDs. He has sung 350 songs in four languages.

Main hits

 1971 : Je n'ai jamais aimé comme je t'aime, Vogue
 1972 : Je voudrais dormir près de toi, Vogue
 1972 : Laisse-moi vivre ma vie, Vogue
 1973 : Quand vient le soir on se retrouve, Vogue
 1973 : Un chant d'amour un chant d'été, Vogue
 1973 : Viens te perdre dans mes bras, Vogue
 1973 : Pour toi, Vogue
 1974 : Il est déjà trop tard / Viens me retrouver
 1974 : Si je te demande Vogue
 1975 : Chicago, Vogue
 1984 : On s'embrasse, on oublie tout, Vogue
 1984 : Mon cœur te dit je t'aime, Trema
 1985 : Je t'aime à l'italienne, Trema
 1987 : Une nuit ne suffit pas, Trema
 1988 : L'amour s'en va l'amour revient, Trema
 1989 : Qui de nous deux, Trema
 1990 : Est-ce que tu es seule ce soir, Trema
 1993 : Tzigane, MBM-BMG
 1995 : Les Italos-Américains, MBM-BMG
 1997 : L'amour fou, MBM-BMG
 1997 : Je ne t'oublie pas, MBM-BMG
 2001 : Un slow pour s'aimer, MBM-BMG
 2005 : Et si l'on parlait d'amour, MBM-BMG
 2007 : Merci la vie, MBM-Sony/BMG
 2010 : Chanteur d'amour, MBM-Sony/BMG
 2013 : Amor Latino, MBM-Sony/BMG

Discography

Singles
 1966 : Petite fille, Polydor
 1969 : Sylvie, Barclay
 1970 : La nuit n'a pas de couleur, Barclay
 1970 : Marian, Barclay
 1970 : Triste Matin, Barclay
 1970 : Mini maxi Dolly, Barclay
 1971 : Jean, AZ
 1971 : Mini maxi Dolly, AZ
 1971 : Shabala, AZ
 1971 : I love you, je t'aime, AZ
 1971 : I love you je t'aime (+suis je né pour pleurer), London-Canada
 1971 : I love you je t'aime, Ekipo-Espagne
 1971 : I love you, je t'aime, Vogue-Belgique
 1971 : I love you ti amo, Rare-Italie
 1971 : Shabala, Vogue-Belgique
 1971 : Je n'ai jamais aimé comme je t'aime, Vogue
 1971 : Ma chance c'est de t'avoir, Vogue-Belgique
 1972 : Amare e' avere te (Ma chance c'est de t'avoir), CBS-Sugar-Vogue
 1972 : Ma chance c'est de t'avoir, Ekipo-Espagne
 1972 : Ma vie c'est toi, Vogue
 1972 : Shabala, Ekipo-Espagne
 1972 : Je voudrais dormir près de toi, Vogue
 1972 : Je voudrais dormir près de toi, Vogue-Japon
 1972 : Laisse-moi vivre ma vie, Vogue
 1972 : Laisse-moi vivre ma vie, Vogue-Portugal
 1972 : Laisse-moi vivre ma vie, Vogue-Japon
 1973 : Quand vient le soir on se retrouve, Vogue
 1973 : Quand vient le soir on se retrouve, Vogue-Portugal
 1973 : Pour toi, Vogue
 1973 : Un chant d'amour, un chant d'été, Vogue
 1973 : Un chant d'amour, un chant d'été, Vogue-Japon
 1973 : Tu non-sei piu' come una volta (laisse moi vivre ma vie), Vogue-Italie
 1973 : Viens te perdre dans mes bras, Vogue
 1973 : Viens te perdre dans mes bras, Vogue-Portugal
 1974 : N'oublie jamais (+ Si je te demande) Vogue
 1974 : N'oublie jamais (+ Tu veux rester libre) Alvaroda-Portugal
 1974 : Il est déjà trop tard, Vogue
 1974 : Tant que je vivrai, Vogue
 1975 : Mal tu me fais mal, Vogue
 1975 : Maintenant que tu es loin de moi, Vogue
 1975 : Chicago (+ Comment veux-tu que je t'oublie), Vogue
 1975 : C'est Noël (+ C'est Noël avec la chorale), Vogue-Belgique
 1975 : Tu veux rester libre (+ c'est noël sur la terre), Vogue-Toho records-Japon
 1975 : Chicago (+ C'est ma faute), Ariola-Allemagne
 1976 : Baby dollar, Vogue
 1976 : Fanny Fanny, Vogue
 1976 : Baby dollar (+ Fanny Fanny), Ariola-Allemagne
 1976 : San Francisco, Vogue
 1976 : San Francisco, Vogue-Japon
 1976 : C'est Noël (+ C'est ma faute), Vogue
 1977 : On comprend toujours quand c'est trop tard, Vogue
 1977 : De Venise à Capri, Vogue
 1977 : De Venise à Capri, Ariola-Allemagne
 1977 : Belle, tu es belle (+ Valentino), Vogue
 1977 : Belle, tu es belle (+ Valentino), Ariola-Allemagne
 1978 : Sois romantique, Vogue
 1978 : Au dancing de mon cœur, Vogue
 1978 : Giorgia, Vogue
 1979 Un amour d'aujourd'hui, Vogue
 1979 : Via Italia (+ Seul), Vogue
 1980 : Via Italia (+ N'oublie jamais nous deux), Vogue
 1980 : Qui t'a dit qu'en ce temps là, Vogue
 1980 : Je rêve sur mon piano, Vogue
 1980 : Je rêve sur mon piano, Vogue-Belgique
 1981 : Je veux chanter la nostalgie, Vogue
 1981 : Douce Douce, Vogue
 1982 : J'aimerai te faire du bien ( + Le p'tit yellow submarine), promo Vogue-Modulation-Canada
 1982 : Un homme dans ta vie (+ Lisa donna Lisa), promo Vogue-Modulation-Canada
 1982 : On s'aimera toute la vie (duo avec Gloria), Vogue
 1982 : Adios amor (+ Nous étions des amis), Vogue
 1982 : Adios amor (+ I love you, je t'aime, en espagnol) Vogue
 1982 : Je n'ai jamais aimé comme je t'aime, Ekipo-Espagne
 1982 : Tu veux rester libre, Vogue-Japon
 1983 : Aimer, Vogue
 1984 : On s'embrasse, on oublie tout, Tréma
 1984 : Mon cœur te dit je t'aime, Trema
 1985 : Une femme pour toute la vie, Trema
 1985 : Je t'aime à l'italienne, Trema
 1986 : Quand papa chantait, Trema
 1986 : L'aimer encore, Trema
 1987 : Nina Ninouschka, Trema
 1987 : Une nuit ne suffit pas, Trema
 1988 : Çà commence comme une histoire d'amour (+ Un garçon pleure), Trema-Trans-Canada
 1988 : L'amour s'en va l'amour revient, Trema
 1989 : Une simple histoire d'amour, Trema
 1989 : Qui de nous deux, Trema
 1990 : C'est toi qui pars, Trema
 1990 : Est-ce que tu es seule ce soir, Trema
 1991 : Je me battrai pour elle, Trema
 1992 : Je ne te suffis pas, Trema
 1992 : Bleu méditerranée, Trema
 1992 : Encore une nuit sans toi, Trema
 1993 : L'amour c'est la musique, MBM-BMG
 1993 : Tzigane, MBM-BMG-ARIOLA Belgique

Laser singles

 1990 : Est ce que tu es seule ce soir, TREMA-Pathé Marconi
 1991 : Je me battrai pour elle, TREMA-Pathé Marconi
 1992 : Je ne te suffis pas, TREMA-Sony music
 1992 : Bleu méditerranée,TREMA-Sony music
 1992 : Encore une nuit sans toi, TREMA-Sony music
 1993 : L'amour c'est la musique, MBM-BMG
 1993 : Tzigane, MBM-BMG
 1993 : Si tu t'en vas, MBM-BMG
 1994 : Fou d'elle (Live Olympia 94), MBM-BMG
 1995 : Les Italo-Américains, MBM-BMG
 1995 : En plein soleil, MBM-BMG
 1995 : Y a-t-il quelqu'un ?, MBM-BMG
 1995 : O Sole mio, MBM-BMG
 1996 : Funiculi Funicula (promo), MBM-BMG
 1996 : Luna Rossa (promo live Olympia 96), MBM-BMG
 1997 : L'amour fou, MBM-BMG
 1997 : Je ne t'oublie pas, MBM-BMG
 1997 : Chiquita, MBM-BMG
 1997 : Le jardin de mr Paul, MBM-BMG
 1998 : Je veux tout, MBM-BMG
 1999 : Volare, MBM-BMG
 2001 : Mourir d'amour (promo live Olympia 2000), MBM-BMG
 2001 : Un slow pour s'aimer, MBM-BMG-Une Musique
 2002 : Ensemble on gagnera, MBM-BMG-Une Musique
 2002 : Tant qu'il y aura des femmes, MBM-BMG
 2002 : Petite maman (édition bonus), MBM-BMG-Une Musique
 2003 : Méditerranée/Quand Tino chantait, MBM-BMG
 2003 : Paix sur la terre (versions studio/live), MBM-BMG
 2005 : Et si on parlait d'amour (promo), BMG Media
 2005 : Tu sais bien, MBM-Sony-BMG
 2007 : Une rose dans le désert, MBM-BMG-Sony-Columbia-Vogue
 2007 : L'amour c'est comme le tango, MBM-BMG-Sony-Columbia-Vogue
 2008 : Somethin' stupid (promo live tour 2008), MBM-Sony-BMG
 2009 : Somethin' stupid + clip (live tour 2008), MBM-Sony Music
 2010 : C'est plus fort que moi /Chanteur d'amour /Ils font un rêve, MBM-Sony Music
 2011 : La Tarentelle d'amour (promo tour 2011), MBM-Sony Music
 2012 : Je n'ai pas fini de t'aimer, MBM-Sony Music
 2013 : Amor latino /Qu'as tu fait de moi/Ok pour t'emmener, MBM-Sony Music

33-tours 
 1971 : I love you, je t'aime, Vogue
 1971 : I love you, je t'aime, London-Canada
 1972 : Je voudrais dormir près de toi, Vogue
 1972 : Je voudrais dormir près de toi, Vogue-Belgique
 1972 : Je voudrais dormir près de toi, Vogue-Espagne
 1972 : Je voudrais dormir près de toi, Vogue-Argentine
 1973 : Laisse-moi vivre ma vie, Vogue
 1973 : Viens te perdre dans mes bras, Vogue
 1973 : Ma vie en musique (version instrumentale, vol 1), Vogue
 1973 : 12 premiers succès de Frédéric François, Vogue-Japon
 1974 : Tant que je vivrai, Vogue
 1974 : Tant que je vivrai, Vogue-Japon
 1974 : Viens te perdre dans mes bras, Vogue-Japon
 1975 : Chicago, Vogue
 1976 : San Francisco, Vogue
 1976 : Ma vie en musique, Vogue-Argentine
 1977 : Belle tu es belle, Vogue
 1977 : Laisse-moi vivre ma vie, Vogue-Japon
 1978 : Giorgia, Vogue
 1979 : Giorgia, Vogue-Argentine
 1980 : Qui t'a dit qu'en ce temps là, Vogue
 1981 : Je veux chanter la nostalgie, Vogue
 1981 : Un chant d'amour un chant d'été, Vogue-Japon
 1982 : Adios amor, Vogue
 1983 : Aimer, Vogue
 1984 : Mon cœur te dit je t'aime, Trema
 1985 : Je t'aime à l'italienne, Trema
 1986 : L'aimer encore, Trema
 1988 : Une nuit ne suffit pas, Trema
 1988 : Live de l'Olympia, Trema
 1989 : L'amour s'en va, l'amour revient, Trema
 1990 : Qui de nous deux, Trema
 1990 : Olympia 90, Trema
 1991 : Est-ce que tu es seule ce soir, Trema
 1992 : Je ne te suffis pas, Trema

Laser albums

 1984 : Mon cœur te dit je t'aime, Trema
 1985 : Je t'aime à l'italienne, Trema
 1986 : L'aimer encore, Trema
 1988 : Une nuit ne suffit pas, Trema
 1988 : Live de l'Olympia, Trema
 1989 : L'amour s'en va, l'amour revient, Trema
 1990 : Qui de nous deux, Trema
 1990 : Olympia 90, Trema
 1991 : Est-ce que tu es seule ce soir, Trema
 1992 : Je ne te suffis pas, Trema
 1990 : Olympia 90, Trema
 1991 : Est-ce que tu es seule ce soir, Trema
 1992 : Je ne te suffis pas, Trema
 1993 : Tzigane, MBM-BMG
 1994 : Les chansons de mon cœur,MBM-BMG
 1994 : Olympia 94, MBM-BMG
 1995 : Les Italo-Américains, MBM-BMG
 1995 : Les plus grandes chansons napolitaines, MBM-BMG
 1996 : Album d'or, MBM-BMG
 1996 : Olympia 96, MBM-BMG
 1997 : Les chansons de mon cœur vol 2, MBM-BMG
 1997 : Je ne t'oublie pas, MBM-BMG
 1998 : Olympia 98, MBM-BMG
 1998 : Best of de mes Olympia, MBM-BMG
 1998 : Pour toi Maman édition spéciale 4 CD MBM-BMG
 1999 : Les plus grandes mélodies italiennes, MBM-BMG
 1999 : Frédéric François " Le collector ", MBM-BMG
 2000 : Olympia 2000, MBM-BMG
 2001 : Un slow pour s'aimer, MBM-BMG
 2001 : 60 chansons 3 CD, MBM-BMG
 2001 : L'essentiel, MBM-BMG
 2002 : Frédéric François chante Noël, MBM-BMG
 2003 : Olympia 2002 spectacle intégral, MBM-BMG
 2003 : Les romances de toujours, MBM-BMG
 2004 : 30 chansonsde légende, MBM-BMG
 2004 : Un été d'amour, MBM-BMG
 2005 : Bailamos, MBM/Sony-BMG
 2005 : Et si l'on parlait d'amour, MBM/Sony-BMG
 2005 : Olympia 2005, MBM/Sony-BMG
 2006 : Les chansons mythiques des années 70, MBM/Sony-BMG
 2006 : Les indispensables, MBM/Sony-BMG
 2006 : Mes préférences, MBM/Sony-BMG
 2007 : Pour toi maman 2007, MBM/Sony-BMG
 2007 : Une vie d'amour, MBM/Sony-BMG
 2007 : Merci la vie, MBM/Sony-BMG
 2008 : 20 ans d'Olympia, MBM/Sony-BMG
 2008 : Tour 2008 de l'Olympia à Forest National, MBM/Sony-BMG
 2010 : Chanteur d'amour, MBM/Sony-BMG
 2011 : 40 succès en or, MBM/Sony-BMG
 2011 : Tour 2011-Le spectacle anniversaire, MBM/Sony-BMG
 2012 : Je n'ai pas fini de t'aimer / Parler d'amour, MBM/Sony-BMG
 2012 : Pour toi maman 2012, MBM/Sony-BMG
 2012 : Album d'Or 2012, MBM/Sony-BMG
 2012 : L'intégrale 1992 à 2012, MBM/Sony-BMG
 2013 : Amor Latino, MBM/Sony-BMG
 2014 : Best of – 3CD, MBM/Sony-BMG
 2014 : 30 ans d'Olympia – Live 2014 , MBM/Sony-BMG
 2014 : La Magie de Noël, MBM/Sony-BMG
 2015 : Fidèle, MBM/Sony-BMG*
 2015 : 30 ans d'Olympia – Live 2014 – includes a DVD MBM/Sony-BMG

DVD 
 1990 : Forest National 1990 – Live 90
 1994 : Spectacle au Canada – Live 94
 1996 : 25 ans d'Amour – Olympia 1996 
 1998 : Olympia 1998 – Live 98
 2000 : 2000 ans D'amour – Olympia 2000
 2000 : La vidéo du Siècle 
 2001 : Karaoké 
 2003 : Olympia 2002 – Live 2002 
 2006 : Olympia 2005 – Live 2005
 2006 : Olympia 2002, Olympia 2005 et Karaoké
 2008 : Ma vidéo d'Or – 20 ans d'images coup de coeur 
 2009 : Tours 2008 de l'Olympia à Forest National – Live 2008
 2009 : La vidéo d'Or de mes tendre années 
 2011 : Tours 2011 – Spectacle Anniversaire 
 2015 : 30 ans d'Olympia – Olympia 2014 (Prévue pour le 27 Avril 2915)

Audiovisual

It was in the summer of 1969 that people heard Frédéric François sing on the radio for the first time:  on the Belgian station RTBF. He performed "Sylvie." He was a guest on his first radio show a few weeks later on that same station.

In France, in 1970, it was Europe 1 that broadcast a song by Frédéric François for the first time, "Jean," which put him in the charts (of that station) for the first time.  In the second half of 1971, "Je n'ai jamais aimé comme je t'aime" was played for the first time on the "Formule J" programme of the RTBF. This song stayed at number one for thirteen weeks. The French in the Nord-Pas-de-Calais, who listen often to radio stations transmitting from Belgium, could not find this single at their record shops, because it was not distributed in France, and crossed the border to buy it in Belgian record shops.

He participated in his first radio show in France in 1972 on Europe N°1, in "5, 6, 7" presented by Jacques Ourévitch, at the time that "Je voudrais dormir près de toi" came out.  Michel Jonasz and Michel Berger were in the same studio, as they were embarking on their careers.

His first television show was broadcast in 1972, on the sole French station at the time, the ORTF. Presented by Guy Lux, it was transmitted live from the little white wine feast in Nogent-sur-Marne (Val-de-Marne). He was roosted on a float in the company of Mike Brant, and both of them were driven through all the streets of the city!

That same year, he took part in his second television show: “Midi-Première” presented by Danièle Gilbert and Jacques Martin. He met there his fellow Italian/Sicilian/Belgian countryman, Salvatore Adamo, who was already a big star. It was the start of an enduring lifelong friendship.

In 1973, the presenter Christian Morin on Europe N°1 was the first to use the diminutive "Frédo" to refer to him, during a programme called "Le hit parade" where he was invited to reward the millionth buyer of his single "Laisse-moi vivre ma vie."

In December 1974, he sang live on RTL. He was not in the major studio, but in the Church of Chesnay in the Yvelines, before two hundred children and their parents. The proceeds went to the handicapped children of Garches (Hauts-de-Seine) and to fatherless children of the "Le Nid de la ville d'Antony" [The Nest of Anthony's City] foundation. In the beginning of 1975, in the programme entitled "Samedi est à vous" [Saturday over to you] presented by Bernard Golay on the first station of the ORTF, he was tied, with Mike Brant, for first place, as the favourite singer of television viewers.

From 1975 to 1979, he appeared on "Ring-parade" on Antenne 2, presented by Guy Lux and Jean-Pierre Foucault.

Radio has been decisive in Frédéric François's career, because it was thanks to free radio stations that he tasted success, when they had just come into being, by playing "Adios Amor" extensively in 1982, which brought him out of three long years in the wilderness.

From 1983 to 1998, he was invited many times to the Jacques Martin's "École des Fans" [School of Fans] as part of the programme "Dimanche Martin" [Sunday Martin].

As of 1984, Pascal Sevran invited him regularly to appear in "La Chance aux Chansons"  [Give songs a chance].  In 1995, he was the main guest of the show for an entire week, when his second album, "Les Italos-Américains" [Italian Americans] was released.

In 1988, he was on hand for the launch of a brand new show of the Belgian station RTL-TVI, "Télévie" [Telelife], which raised funds for leukaemia. He would make it a point of honour to participate every year down to the present day.  In France, during a broadcast of Jean-Pierre Foucault's "Sacrée Soirée" [Hell of an evening] in 1988, his son Anthony surprised him by singing Chicago, accompanied by his sister Gloria (on guitar) and his brother Vincent (on piano).

On 17 December 1988, Patrick Sabatier devoted a broadcast of "Avis de Recherche" [Wanted] on TF1. He and his seven brothers and sisters are united for the first time in a television studio. His wife, Monique, has sung only once in public, during a "Sacrée Soirée" show for Valentine's Day, on 14 February 1991, when she joined him in a rendition of "Mon cœur te dit je t'aime.”

On 12 April 1991, "Tous à la Une" [All in the headlines] asked him to be its exceptional editor in chief on TF1. Frédéric Mitterrand devoted his "C'est notre vie" [It's our life] show on 17 June 1994, during which he met the actress who made him dream in his youth, Gina Lollobrigida.  He improvised "Le Chaland" [The Barge] on the guitar, in Italian, because he knew it was one of her favourite songs, which served as a leitmotiv for several cult films in Italy.

In 1999, RTL-TVI and Marylène Bergmann devoted to him a special show recorded live at the Cirque Royal [Royal Circus] in Brussels. On 25 April 2009, he sponsored a new programme on the Belgian station RTL-TVI entitled "Au cœur de Télévie" [At the heart of Telelife] to get people to understand the scourge that is cancer through reports and interviews.  On the same day, he was on stage at the same station, as every year, for "Télévie" for research on all forms of cancer. It was during this evening that he sang for the first time again, after having ceased all activities for six months.

In France, although he had not appeared in public since his concert on 17 October 2008 at Micropolis in Besançon, he wanted television viewers to see that he was doing well by making a surprise appearance on 14 May 2009 in Sophie Davant's show "C'est au programme" [It's on the programme] on France 2. On the radio, he broke his silence only once, at the request of Dave, who presented a revamped version of Top 50 the entire summer on Europe 1. The footage was broadcast on 17 August 2009.

In 2010, during Daniela Lumbroso's "Chabada" show, Frédéric François was surrounded by Salvatore Adamo and the tenor Roberto Alagna. None of the three singers stuck to the initial programme (they were to pay homage to Polnareff, Brassens and Luis Mariano respectively), and together, they created a "Sicilian" ambiance on stage, bringing their childhood memories musically back to life.

In 2011, during a special "Vivement Dimanche" [Ever on Sunday] show devoted to Italy, Michel Drucker invited Frédéric François, who joined Ornella Muti, Arturo Brachetti and "Les Prêtres" [The Priests] on stage. That same year, Stéphane Pauwels launched a new show on the Belgian RTL-TVI station: "Les orages de la vie" [The storms of life], the aim of which is to show that even the biggest stars have gone through stormy patches. He asked Frédéric François to be the first "subject" of his show, and took him back to Tilleur, the neighbourhood of his youth, in the house where his parents used to live when his first producer, Constant Defourny, came knocking on their door.

During the 2010s, Frédéric François was a regular guest on many shows such as Patrick Sébastien's "Les Années Bonheur" [Years of happiness], Humbert Ibach's "Les Grands du Rire" [The great comedians], presented by Yves Lecoq, or "Face à Face" [Face to Face] on RTL-TVI.

In the beginning of 2014, Frédéric was invited to Sophie Davant's "C'est au programme,"  during the course of which the writer Marc Lévy paid him a stirring tribute, as if he had written the exceptional destiny of little Francesco Barracato. Frédéric was very moved, to the point of wishing to include this video in his new tour, in a segment entitled "Hommage à mon père" [Homage to my father].

Bibliography
 1985 : Les yeux charbon (Editions Carrère-Lafon)
 2000 : Ma Vie (Editions Hors Collection) (with Serge Igor).
 2005 : Autobiographie d'un sicilien (Editions Ramsay).
 2008 : Merci la vie ! (Editions du Rocher) (with the photographer Patrick Carpentier).
 2011 : Une vie d'amour

Decorations

 1999 : Knight of Arts and Letters of the Order of Leopold II, from the hands of the Belgian Minister for Culture, Pierre Hazette.
 2008 : Honorary citizen of the City of Wanze (Belgium)..
 2009 : Commander of the Order of Merit of the Italian Republic (Commendatore dell'Ordine al Merito della Republica Italiana) from the hands of the Italian Consul in Liège, with the approval of the President of the Italian Council, Silvio Berlusconi. This distinction was conferred on him before 10,000 people in Blégny-Mine, the only mine museum in Belgium. He is the first Italian artist with an immigrant background to receive this honour.
 2011 : Ambassador of the Province of Liège 
 2012 : Handing over of the keys of his native town, Lercara Friddi, Province of Palermo – Sicily. (equivalent to an honorary citizen)
 2013 : 2013: Crystal Heart conferred by the Belgian Prime Minister Elio Di Rupo.

References

1950 births
Living people
Musicians from Liège
Italian emigrants to Belgium
Belgian people of Sicilian descent
Belgian pop singers
Belgian male singers